The 2016 United States House of Representatives elections in North Carolina were held on November 8, 2016, to elect the 13 U.S. representatives from the state of North Carolina, one from each of the state's 13 congressional districts. The elections coincided with the 2016 U.S. presidential election, as well as other elections to the House of Representatives, elections to the United States Senate and various state and local elections.

Primary elections were originally scheduled for March 15, but were moved to June 7, due to successful challenges to the 1st and 12th congressional districts in federal court and the drawing of new maps affecting almost all of the state's districts.

Long before the court had ruled, candidates had filed for the March 15 party primaries for each district under the old maps in December 2015, per the North Carolina State Board of Elections. After the court ruled and the North Carolina General Assembly passed new district maps, the State Board established a filing period for the new primary date for candidates of major parties, March 16–25. Candidates had to refile for the June 7 primary, if they still chose to run, in any district they chose. The results of the March 15 primary, which went ahead because ballots had already been printed and mailed to absentee voters by the time of the ruling, were not counted.

2016 North Carolina redistricting

The North Carolina Legislature's 2012 redistricting was found unconstitutional by the United States District Court for the Middle District of North Carolina and replaced on February 19, 2016.

Results summary

Statewide

District
Results of the 2016 United States House of Representatives elections in North Carolina by district:

District 1

The 1st district is located in Northeastern North Carolina. The new map made the 1st district somewhat more compact. The incumbent is Democrat G. K. Butterfield, who has represented the district since 2004. He was re-elected with 73% of the vote in 2014.

Democratic primary

Candidates

Nominee 
G. K. Butterfield, incumbent U.S. Representative

Republican primary

Candidates
No candidates filed for the Republican primary for this seat under the old map, but Powell Dew Jr filed under the new map and was unopposed for his party's nomination.

Nominee 
H. Powell Dew Jr., member of the Stantonsburg Town Council

Libertarian primary
C. L. Cooke was running unopposed for the Libertarian nomination under the old map. J. J. Summerell was the only Libertarian candidate to file under the new map.

General election

Endorsements

Results

District 2

The 2nd district is located in central North Carolina. The new map moved the 2nd district to the east and the north. The incumbent is Republican Renee Ellmers, who has represented the district since 2011. She was re-elected with 59% of the vote in 2014. Renee Ellmers ran for re-election to a fourth term.

Republican primary
Ellmers faced a primary challenge from radio host Frank Roche in 2014.  Despite Roche's weak fundraising, she won the primary by only 59% to 41%.  Her role in a 20-week abortion ban bill being pulled intensified calls from the conservative wing to challenge her in 2016.

Jim Duncan, the former chairman of the Chatham County Republican Party and co-founder of the grassroots organization The Coalition for American Principles, challenged Ellmers for the Republican nomination at first but dropped out after the district lines changed.  2014 candidate Frank Roche also ran again at first but likewise did not file in the new 2nd district. Businessman Tim D'Annunzio and former North Carolina Republican Party communications director Kay Daly also ran before the district map changed and then switched to other districts.

The new district incorporated much of what had been the 13th district, leading that district's representative, George Holding, to file as a candidate in the 2nd, although his home was now in the 4th district. Meanwhile, Greg Brannon entered the 2nd district GOP primary as well, after losing the primary for U.S. Senate to incumbent Richard Burr.

Ellmers was subject to a high level of campaign spending by outside groups aligning themselves with the Tea Party movement, including Americans for Prosperity, which spent in the "low six figures" to defeat her. They opposed Ellmers for her votes on a bill related to abortion as well as votes on spending and budget bills, and to support the continuation of the Export-Import Bank.

Candidates

Nominee
George Holding, incumbent U.S. Representative for North Carolina's 13th congressional district

Eliminated in primary
Greg Brannon, physician, Tea Party activist and candidate for the U.S. Senate in 2014 & 2016
Renee Ellmers, incumbent U.S. Representative

Withdrawn
Tim D'Annunzio, businessman, nominee for North Carolina's 4th congressional district in 2012 and candidate for North Carolina's 8th congressional district in 2010. (running in the 8th district)
Kay Daly (running in the 13th district) 
Jim Duncan, chair of the Chatham County Republican Party, co-founder of the grassroots organization The Coalition for American Principles
Frank Roche, conservative internet talk show host and lecturer in economics at Elon University, candidate for this seat in 2012, candidate for North Carolina's 4th congressional district in 2010 & candidate for State Treasurer in 2012

Results

Democratic primary
Adam Coker was running unopposed for the Democratic nomination under the previous district map. After the new map was adopted, two candidates who had previously filed to run in the 13th district, like Holding, filed in the 2nd: John McNeil and Ron Sanyal. They were joined by three other candidates who had previously not filed for any seat.

Candidates

Nominee 
John P. McNeil, attorney and U.S. Marine Corps veteran

Eliminated in primary
Elton R. Brewington
Steven E. Hight
Ron Sanyal, candidate for this seat in 2014
Jane Watson

Withdrawn
Adam Coker, small business owner and entrepreneur (running in 13th district)

Results

General election

Endorsements

Results

District 3

The 3rd district is located on the Atlantic coast of North Carolina. It covers the Outer Banks and the counties adjacent to the Pamlico Sound. The new map made the district somewhat more compact, removing some of its more southern and western areas.

The incumbent is Republican Walter B. Jones Jr., who has represented the district since 1995. He was re-elected with 68% of the vote in 2014.

Republican primary
Jones, who has a reputation as a maverick, is running for re-election, saying "I like to be a thorn in people's ass". Taylor Griffin, a one-time aide to United States Senator Jesse Helms and to President George W. Bush, ran against Jones in the Republican primary again in 2016, just as he had done in 2014.

Candidates

Nominee 
Walter B. Jones Jr., incumbent U.S. Representative

Eliminated in primary
Taylor Griffin, former aide to Senator Jesse Helms and President George W. Bush, candidate for this seat in 2014
Phil Law, Hewlett-Packard site supervisor and Marine veteran

Results

Democratic primary
David Allan Hurst was running unopposed for the Democratic nomination under the old map. After the new district map was adopted, he was joined by U.S. Army veteran Ernest T. Reeves, who had just lost the Democratic primary for U.S. Senate to Deborah Ross.

Candidates

Nominee
Ernest T. Reeves, candidate for U.S. Senate in 2014 and 2016

Eliminated in primary
David Allan Hurst

Results

General election

Results

District 4

The 4th district is located in the Research Triangle area. The new map made the 4th district more compact, removing its southern portions. The incumbent is Democrat David Price, who has represented the district since 1997, and previously represented it from 1987 to 1995. He was re-elected with 75% of the vote in 2014.

Democratic primary

Candidates

Nominee
David Price, incumbent U.S. Representative

Republican primary
Sue Googe, a first generation, Chinese immigrant, filed to challenge Price.

Candidates

Nominee
 Sue Googe, real estate investment company founder

Eliminated in primary
 Teiji Kimball, U.S. Army Reserve. veteran

Results

General election

Endorsements

Results

District 5

The 5th district is located in northwestern North Carolina, from the Appalachian Mountains to the Piedmont Triad area. The new map shifted the district slightly to the north and put the entirety of Forsyth County in the district. The incumbent is Republican Virginia Foxx, who has represented the district since 2005. She was re-elected with 61% of the vote in 2014.

Republican primary

Candidates

Nominee
Virginia Foxx, incumbent U.S. Representative

Eliminated in primary
Pattie Curran, Tea party activist

Results

Democratic primary
Josh Brannon, the 2014 nominee for this seat, was running unopposed for the Democratic nomination under the previous district map. After the new district map was adopted, he was joined by two other challengers, including Jim Roberts, who had previously been running in the 6th district.

Candidates

Nominee
Josh Brannon, software developer and nominee for this seat in 2014

Eliminated in primary
Jim Roberts, former president of the North Carolina Pest Management Association and U.S. Air Force veteran
Charlie Wallin

Results

General election

Results

District 6

The 6th district is located in northern-central North Carolina. The new map made the district more compact, removing some western, eastern and southern portions. The incumbent is Republican Mark Walker, who has represented the district since 2015. He was elected with 59% of the vote in 2014, succeeding retiring Republican incumbent Howard Coble.

Republican primary

Candidates

Nominee
Mark Walker, incumbent U.S. Representative

Eliminated in primary
Chris Hardin, pharmaceutical representative

Withdrawn
Kenn Kopf, attorney and candidate for this seat in 2014 (withdrew December 21 2015)

Results

Democratic primary
Former Guilford County Commissioner Bruce Davis, former Alamance County Democratic Party Chairman Pete Glidewell and Jim Roberts were seeking the Democratic nomination to challenge Walker under the old map. After the new map was adopted, Davis and Roberts filed to run in different districts, leaving Glidewell unopposed for the nomination.

Candidates

Nominee
Pete Glidewell, former Alamance County Democratic Party Chair

Withdrawn
Bruce Davis, former Guilford County Commissioner (running in the 13th district)
Jim Roberts (running in the 5th district)

General election

Results

District 7

The 7th district is located in southeastern North Carolina. The new map shifted the district slightly to the east, but much of it remained the same. The incumbent is Republican David Rouzer, who has represented the district since 2015. He was elected with 59% of the vote in 2014, succeeding retiring Democratic incumbent Mike McIntyre.

Republican primary
Rouzer is running for re-election to a second term. Former North Carolina Republican Party second congressional district Chairman Mark Otto was challenging Rouzer for the Republican nomination under the old map, but did not file his candidacy under the new map.

Candidates

Nominee
David Rouzer, incumbent U.S. Representative

Withdrawn
Mark Otto, former North Carolina Republican Party second congressional district chair

Declined
Haywood "Woody" White, New Hanover County Commissioner, former state senator and candidate for this seat in 2014

Democratic primary

Nominee 
 J. Wesley Casteen, an attorney, CPA, and Libertarian nominee for this seat 2014

General election

Results

District 8

The 8th district is located in southern-central North Carolina. The new map shifted the district slightly to the north and to the east. The incumbent is Republican Richard Hudson, who has represented the district since 2013.  He was re-elected with 65% of the vote in 2014.

Republican primary
Richard Hudson ran for re-election to a third term, and was unopposed for the Republican nomination under the old map. After the new district map was adopted, Tim D'Annunzio, who had been running in the 2nd district, filed instead to run in the 8th.

Candidates

Nominee
Richard Hudson, incumbent U.S. Representative

Eliminated in primary
Tim D'Annunzio, businessman, nominee for North Carolina's 4th congressional district in 2012 and candidate this district in 2010.

Declined
Wes Rhinier, Rowan County Republican Party Executive Committee member

Results

Democratic primary

Candidates

Nominee
Thomas Mills, political and public affairs consultant and Founder/Editor-Publisher of Politics NC

Declined
Cal Cunningham, former state senator from the 23rd district and candidate for the U.S. Senate in 2010

General election

Endorsements

Results

District 9

The 9th district is located in south-central North Carolina. The new map moved the 9th district to the east and to the south. The incumbent is Republican Robert Pittenger, who has represented the district since 2013. He was re-elected with 94% of the vote in 2014.

Republican primary
George Rouco, an attorney and former CIA officer, was challenging Pittenger for the Republican nomination under the old map. After the new map was adopted, Rouco filed to run in the 13th district instead. Meanwhile, two other Republicans filed to challenge Pittenger: Rev. Mark Harris, who ran in 2014 for the U.S. Senate and former Union County Commissioner Todd Johnson.

Candidates

Nominee
Robert Pittenger, incumbent U.S. Representative

Eliminated in primary
Mark Harris, pastor and candidate for U.S. Senate in 2014
Todd Johnson, former Union County Commissioner

Withdrawn
George Rouco, attorney and former CIA officer (running in the 13th district)

Results

Harris called for a recount, as allowed under state law because Pittenger's margin of victory was so small.

Democratic primary

Nominee 
Christian Cano, hotel manager and hospitality consultant

General election

Endorsements

Results

District 10

The 10th district is located in central and western North Carolina. The new map made only minor changes to the district. The incumbent is Republican Patrick McHenry, who has represented the district since 2005. He was re-elected with 61% of the vote in 2014.

Republican primary
Patrick McHenry is running for re-election. He was being opposed by one candidate, Albert Wiley, in the Republican primary under the old map. After the new map was adopted, two more Republican challengers filed.

Candidates

Nominee
Patrick McHenry, incumbent U.S. Representative

Eliminated in primary
Jeffrey Baker
Jeff Gregory, postmaster
Albert Wiley, Jr., physician and professor

Results

Democratic primary

Nominee 
Andy Millard, financial planner

General election

Endorsements

Results

District 11

The 11th district is located in western North Carolina. The new map made only minor changes to the district. The incumbent is Republican Mark Meadows, who has represented the district since 2013. He was re-elected with 63% of the vote in 2014.

Republican primary

Candidates

Nominee
Mark Meadows, incumbent U.S. Representative

Democratic primary

Candidates

Nominee
Rick Bryson, Bryson City Alderman

Eliminated in primary
Tom Hill, physicist, nominee for this seat in 2014 and candidate for this seat 2012

Results

General election

Endorsements

Results

District 12

The 12th district includes nearly all of Charlotte and surrounding Mecklenburg County. The new 2016 map made major changes to the 12th district, which had previously been a narrow district that included parts of Winston-Salem, Greensboro, Lexington, Salisbury, Concord, and High Point, as well as parts of Charlotte. The incumbent is Democrat Alma Adams, who has represented the district since 2014. She was elected with 75% of the vote in 2014.

Democratic primary
Alma Adams is running for re-election to a second term. Adams' home in Greensboro was removed from the 12th district, but she announced she would move to Charlotte. Gardenia Henley, a retired U.S. diplomat, Inspector General Auditor and frequent candidate who ran in 2014 for the 5th district, was challenging Adams for the Democratic nomination under the previous map, and continued to run after the map changed.

Former state senator Malcolm Graham of Mecklenburg County, who lost the 2014 primary to Adams (44%–24%), was rumored as a potential primary challenger.  Subsequently, Graham did not run under the map in place at the time. Later, however, after the new district map was adopted, Graham filed to run. Three members of the North Carolina House of Representatives who represent parts of Mecklenburg County also ran: Tricia Cotham, Carla Cunningham and Rodney W. Moore. Moore later suspended his campaign, but his name remained on the ballot.

Candidates

Nominee
Alma Adams, incumbent U.S. Representative

Eliminated in primary
Tricia Cotham, state representative
Carla Cunningham, state representative
Gardenia Henley, retired U.S. Agency for International Development auditor, candidate for state representative in 2010, for governor in 2012, for Mayor of Winston-Salem in 2013, and candidate for North Carolina's 5th congressional district in 2014
Malcolm Graham, former state senator from the 40th district
Rick Miller

Withdrawn
Juan Antonio Marin Jr.
Rodney W. Moore, state representative

Results

Republican primary

Candidates

Nominee
 Leon Threatt, pastor and former police officer

Eliminated in primary
 Ryan Duffie, securities trader
 Paul Wright, attorney, former District Court & Superior Court judge, candidate for Governor of North Carolina in 2012, nominee for North Carolina's 4th congressional district in 2014 and candidate for U.S. Senate in 2016

Results

General election

Endorsements

Results

District 13

The 13th district is located primarily in the Piedmont Triad area. The new map completely moved the 13th district, which had previously consisted of parts of Wake County and eastern North Carolina. The incumbent is Republican George Holding, who has represented the district since 2013. He was re-elected with 57% of the vote in 2014.

Republican primary
George Holding had been running for re-election to a third term, and was unopposed for the Republican nomination, under the old map. After the new map was adopted, he filed to run in the 2nd district. The new district attracted a large field of Republican candidates of which Ted Budd, a gun shop owner who had never before run for public office, won the Republican nomination with only 20% of the vote.

Candidates

Nominee
Ted Budd, Gun Shop owner

Eliminated in primary
Dan Barrett, county commissioner and candidate for Governor in 2004
John Blust, state representative
Andrew C. Brock, state senator from the 34th district
Kay Daly
Kathy Feather
Chad A. Gant
Hank Henning, Guilford County Commissioner
Julia C. Howard, state representative
Matthew J. McCall
Vernon Robinson, former Winston-Salem city council-member, candidate for North Carolina's 5th congressional district in 2004, nominee for this seat in 2006 and candidate for North Carolina's 8th congressional district in 2012
George Rouco, attorney and former CIA officer
Farren K. Shoaf
James Snyder Jr., attorney, former State Representative, former Davidson County Republican Party chair, candidate for U.S. Senate in 2002 nominee for Lieutenant Governor in 2004 and candidate in 2008 
David W. Thompson, candidate for state representative in 2016
Jason A. Walser
Harry J. Warren, state representative

Withdrawn
George Holding, incumbent U.S. Representative (running in the 2nd district)

Results

Democratic primary
Ron Sanyal, who ran for this seat in 2014, and John P. McNeil, an attorney and U.S. Marine Corps veteran, were running for the seat under the old map. After the new map was adopted, they filed to run in the 2nd district instead.
New candidates in the 13th included businessman Kevin Griffin, who had just lost the Democratic primary for U.S. Senate to Deborah Ross.

Bruce Davis, a veteran, small business owner, and former Guilford County Commissioner, won the Democratic nomination. Bob Isner, father of tennis star John Isner, came in a close second.

Candidates

Nominee
Bruce Davis, former Guilford County Commissioner, candidate for the state senate in 2008, 2010 and 2012 and candidate for North Carolina's 6th congressional district in 2014

Eliminated in primary
Adam Coker, small business owner and entrepreneur
Mazie Ferguson, attorney
Kevin D. Griffin, businessman
Bob Isner, property developer, father of John Isner

Withdrawn
John McNeil, attorney and U.S. Marine Corps veteran (running in the 2nd district)
Ron Sanyal, candidate for North Carolina's 2nd congressional district in 2014 (running in the 2nd district)

Endorsements

Results

General election

Endorsements

Results

References

External links
U.S. House elections in North Carolina, 2016 at Ballotpedia
Campaign contributions at OpenSecrets

House
North Carolina
2016